Lawrence Edgar Pope (February 29, 1940 – May 22, 2013) was an American educator and politician.

Born in Rockford, Illinois, Pope grew up in Des Moines, Iowa. He received his bachelors and law degrees from Drake University. He practiced law, was a lobbyist, and was a law professor at Drake University Law School. He served in the Iowa House of Representatives as a Republican 1979–1983. He died in Des Moines, Iowa.

Notes

1940 births
2013 deaths
Politicians from Rockford, Illinois
Politicians from Des Moines, Iowa
Drake University alumni
Educators from Iowa
Iowa lawyers
Republican Party members of the Iowa House of Representatives
Educators from Illinois
20th-century American lawyers
Drake University Law School alumni
Drake University faculty